Chris Evert Lloyd became the 3-time tournament winner after defeating Steffi Graf 6–3, 6–1 in the final.

Seeds
The first eight seeds received a bye into the second round.

Draw

Finals

Top half

Section 1

Section 2

Bottom half

Section 3

Section 4

References

External links
 Official results archive (ITF)
 Official results archive (WTA)

Virginia Slims of Florida
1986 Virginia Slims World Championship Series